The 1982-83 NBA season was the Bucks' 15th season in the NBA.

Draft picks

Roster

Regular season

Season standings

z - clinched division title
y - clinched division title
x - clinched playoff spot

Record vs. opponents

Game log

|-style="background:#bbffbb;"
| 1 || October 30, 1982 || New York
| W 108–86
|
|
|
| MECCA Arena
| 1–0
|-style="background:#bbffbb;"
| 2 || October 31, 1982 || @ Cleveland
| W 119—95
|Junior Bridgeman (17)
|
|
| Coliseum at Richfield
| 2–0

|-style="background:#fcc;"
| 3 || November 2, 1982 || @ Kansas City
| L 112–119
|
|
|
| Kemper Arena
| 2–1
|-style="background:#bbffbb;"
| 4 || November 4, 1982 || @ Atlanta
| W 104—100
|
|
|
| The Omni
| 3–1
|-style="background:#bbffbb;"
| 5 || November 5, 1982 || San Diego
| W 130–99
|
|
|
| MECCA Arena
| 4–1
|-style="background:#fcc;"
| 5 || November 7, 1982 || Seattle
| L 90–102
|
|
|
| MECCA Arena
| 4–2
|-style="background:#bbffbb;"
| 6 || November 10, 1982 || @ Boston
| W 105—101
|
|
|
| Boston Garden
| 5–2
|-style="background:#fcc;"
| 7 || November 12, 1982 || @ Detroit
| L 100–111
|
|
|
| Pontiac Silverdome
| 5–3
|-style="background:#fcc;"
| 8 || November 14, 1982 || Boston
| L 98–100
|
|
|
| MECCA Arena
| 5–4
|-style="background:#bbffbb;"
| 9 || November 16, 1982 || Indiana
| W 115–103
|
|
|
| MECCA Arena
| 6–4
|-style="background:#bbffbb;"
| 10 || November 18, 1982 || @ New York
| L 89—77
|
|
|
| Madison Square Garden
| 7–4

Playoffs

|- align="center" bgcolor="#ccffcc"
| 1
| April 27
| @ Boston
| W 116–95
| Sidney Moncrief (22)
| Bob Lanier (10)
| Marques Johnson (5)
| Boston Garden15,320
| 1–0
|- align="center" bgcolor="#ccffcc"
| 2
| April 29
| @ Boston
| W 95–91
| Sidney Moncrief (20)
| Marques Johnson (9)
| Sidney Moncrief (4)
| Boston Garden15,320
| 2–0
|- align="center" bgcolor="#ccffcc"
| 3
| May 1
| Boston
| W 107–99
| Sidney Moncrief (26)
| Junior Bridgeman (10)
| Bob Lanier (6)
| MECCA Arena11,052
| 3–0
|- align="center" bgcolor="#ccffcc"
| 4
| May 2
| Boston
| W 107–93
| Marques Johnson (33)
| Alton Lister (11)
| Marques Johnson (6)
| MECCA Arena11,052
| 4–0
|-

|- align="center" bgcolor="#ffcccc"
| 1
| May 8
| @ Philadelphia
| L 109–111 (OT)
| Marques Johnson (30)
| Bob Lanier (9)
| Moncrief, Lanier (6)
| Spectrum18,482
| 0–1
|- align="center" bgcolor="#ffcccc"
| 2
| May 11
| @ Philadelphia
| L 81–87
| Marques Johnson (25)
| Marques Johnson (11)
| Lanier, Winters (4)
| Spectrum18,482
| 0–2
|- align="center" bgcolor="#ffcccc"
| 3
| May 14
| Philadelphia
| L 96–104
| Junior Bridgeman (24)
| Sidney Moncrief (10)
| Brian Winters (7)
| MECCA Arena11,052
| 0–3
|- align="center" bgcolor="#ccffcc"
| 4
| May 15
| Philadelphia
| W 100–94
| Marques Johnson (19)
| Marques Johnson (10)
| Marques Johnson (8)
| MECCA Arena11,052
| 1–3
|- align="center" bgcolor="#ffcccc"
| 5
| May 18
| @ Philadelphia
| L 103–115
| Marques Johnson (21)
| Alton Lister (12)
| Junior Bridgeman (5)
| Spectrum18,482
| 1–4
|-

Player statistics

Player statistics source:

Season

Playoffs

Awards and records
 Sidney Moncrief, NBA Defensive Player of the Year Award
 Sidney Moncrief, All-NBA First Team
 Sidney Moncrief, NBA All-Defensive First Team
 Don Nelson, NBA Coach of the Year Award

Transactions

Trades

References

See also
 1982-83 NBA season

Milwaukee Bucks seasons
M
Milwaukee Bucks
Milwaukee Bucks